State Highway 84A runs in Erode district and Tiruppur districts of Tamil Nadu, India. It connects the towns of Erode and Mulanur.

Route 
The highway passes through Modakurichi, Vilakkethi, Muthur, Vellakoil to a length of 61.6 km.

Major junctions 

 State Highway 84 at Solar, Erode
 Erode Ring Road at Lakkapuram
 State Highway 189 at Muthur
 National Highway NH-81 (Old NH-67) at Vellakoil
 State Highway 21 at Mulanur

References

State highways in Tamil Nadu